Gwernaffield with Pantymwyn is a community in Flintshire, Wales with a population of 1942 as of the 2011 UK census. It includes the villages of Gwernaffield and Pantymwyn.

References

Communities in Flintshire